Angela Douglas (born 29 October 1940), born Angela McDonagh, is an English actress.

Early life
Douglas was born in Gerrards Cross, Buckinghamshire.

Career
Douglas started acting as a teenager, joining the Worthing, West Sussex repertory company, before making her West End theatre debut in 1958.

Douglas made an uncredited appearance as an audience member in the 1958 film version of Six-Five Special. She made her (non-speaking) film debut in 1959 in The Shakedown, and then appeared with Tommy Steele in It's All Happening. She is best remembered for her roles in several Carry On Films in the 1960s, including Carry On Cowboy (1965) as an all-singing and trigger-happy version of Annie Oakley. She then appeared in Carry On Screaming! (1966), Follow That Camel (1967) and Carry On Up the Khyber (1968). She has, by virtue of this association, appeared on many retrospective and spin-off programmes. Douglas made an appearance in North Wales in September 2005 to unveil a plaque dedicated to the filming of Carry On Up the Khyber, as part of the movie had been shot in Llanberis.

Her other films have included The Comedy Man (1964), Digby, the Biggest Dog in the World (1973), and The Four Feathers (2002).

Her television credits have included Gideon's Way, The Avengers, The Saint; in which she played Jenny Turner, a psychology student in the episode The Death Game, Z-Cars, Dixon of Dock Green, Jason King, Casualty, Holby City, Coronation Street, and Doctor at Large.

After her husband Kenneth More was diagnosed with Parkinson's disease, she put her career on hold, after 11 episodes of Oil Strike North. After More's death, she returned in various roles, including Doris Lethbridge-Stewart in Doctor Who serial Battlefield (1989), Peak Practice and Soldier, Soldier,  in the episode "Band of Gold", which featured Robson & Jerome singing in an impromptu wedding band. She played the part of Isobel Trimble in the third series of Cardiac Arrest. She has since concentrated on a career in journalism and writing, having completed two books, including the autobiographical Swings and Roundabouts.

In October 2018 her debut novel, "Josephine: An Open Book" was published. It is fictional but partly based on her own experiences.

Personal life
Douglas met fellow actor Kenneth More on the set of Some People in Bristol in 1962. After starting an affair, More divorced his wife, and the couple were married on 17 March 1968 until his death on 12 July 1982.

In 1988, Douglas met Scottish playwright and director Bill Bryden at a dinner party arranged by mutual friend Marsha Hunt. They married in 2009. Bryden died on 5 January 2022.

Selected filmography

References

External links
 
 Angela Douglas at Aveleyman

1940 births
Living people
Actresses from Buckinghamshire
English film actresses
English stage actresses
English television actresses
People from Gerrards Cross